Shushary is a Saint Petersburg Metro station on the Frunzensko-Primorskaya Line (Line 5) of the Saint Petersburg Metro. It was opened on 3 October 2019 as a part of the extension of the line to the south from Mezhdunarodnaya. The extension also included Prospekt Slavy and Dunayskaya stations. Shushary is the southeastern terminus of the line, behind Dunayskaya.

The station was initially planned as Yuzhnaya, and the name was sometimes used in official communications.

Shushary is built outside of the Saint Petersburg Ring Road, in Frunzensky District. The name refers to the settlement of Shushary.

Transport 
Buses: 197A, 254, 324, 330.

References 

Saint Petersburg Metro stations
Railway stations in Russia opened in 2019